Efren Mendoza Cuahutle (born 9 June 1992) is a Mexican professional footballer. His first team was the Atlas de Guadalajara where he made his debut in the closing of 2011 in the draw to zero of his team against the Club Universidad Nacional being the only game he plays in that tournament. He went to the Pachuca Soccer Club in the 2012 opening. In the 2013 opening, he was transferred to the Black Lions of the University of Guadalajara where he achieved promotion to the maximum circuit and is his current club.

Career

Potros UAEM
On 18 June 2019, Mendoza joined Ascenso MX club Potros UAEM.

References

External links
 
 

Living people
1992 births
Mexican footballers
Association football defenders
Atlas F.C. footballers
C.F. Pachuca players
Leones Negros UdeG footballers
Potros UAEM footballers
Liga MX players
Ascenso MX players
Liga Premier de México players
Tercera División de México players
Footballers from Tlaxcala